Caitlín O'Riordan (born 4 January 1965) is a British musician of Irish and Scottish descent. She played bass guitar for the Irish punk/folk band the Pogues from 1983 to 1986. She later played with Elvis Costello (her husband from 1986 to 2002) as well as several other projects.  She uses the name Rocky O'Riordan on social media and for her Sirius-XM radio show, The Rocky O'Riordan Show.

Biography
Caitlín O'Riordan was born in Nigeria to Irish and Scottish parents, who moved to London when the Nigerian Civil War broke out in 1967. She heard the Nips' song "Gabrielle" on the radio in 1979, and subsequently met future Pogues' frontman Shane MacGowan, who was working at Rocks Off Records, where she went to purchase the record.

In 1982, she was invited by MacGowan to join his newly forming band Pogue Mahone. She appeared on the group's first two albums, Red Roses for Me and Rum Sodomy & the Lash, the EP Poguetry in Motion, and several early singles, before leaving in 1986. Besides playing bass, she provided vocals for "I'm a Man You Don't Meet Every Day" on Rum Sodomy & the Lash, and for "Haunted" on the soundtrack to Alex Cox's film Sid and Nancy. The Pogues' most commercially successful song, "Fairytale of New York" from If I Should Fall from Grace with God, was written as a duet for O'Riordan and MacGowan, but the band eventually recorded it with Kirsty MacColl singing the female part. O'Riordan and Costello are mentioned in the lyrics to "Fiesta" from If I Should Fall from Grace with God.

In 1983, she became the singer in Darryl Hunt's jazz band Pride of the Cross. Hunt had originally planned to ask Wendy May of the Boothill Foot Tappers to be the singer. When he told O'Riordan, she laughed at him and said she ought to do it. At the audition the band told her that she couldn't sing. During her time with Pride of the Cross, she sang lead on their only single, "Tommy's Blue Valentine".

She acted in the 1987 Alex Cox film, Straight to Hell, as the singing dancehall girl Slim McMahon, and also in the 1988 Frank Deasy film The Courier.

O'Riordan became involved with Elvis Costello in 1985, while he was producing the Pogues' album Rum Sodomy & the Lash; they married on 17 May 1986. Her former Pride of the Cross bandmate Darryl Hunt filled in for her on several shows during the Pogues' 1986 U.S. tour, and he replaced her permanently when she left later that year to join Costello on his King of America tour.

She co-wrote the track "Lovable" from that album, and wrote, co-wrote, and appeared on songs on Costello's subsequent albums Blood & Chocolate, Spike and Mighty Like a Rose. O'Riordan and Costello divorced in 2002. In a 2008 interview with the Irish Independent, she denied ever having formally married Costello: "We weren't married...It was a kind of Muslim 'I divorce you' kind of thing."

In 2004, she joined Pogues' guitarist Phil Chevron's re-united band the Radiators; that year she toured with the Pogues for the first time in 18 years. She left the Radiators and was replaced in February 2006 by Jesse Booth, and went on to form a band of divorcées named PreNup with Hothouse Flowers guitarist Fiachna Ó Braonáin.

In 2012, O'Riordan completed a BA in Psychology, followed by an MPsychSc 2013 in UCD. She is currently completing a PhD in Psychology in UCD.

In 2018 O'Riordan joined Pogues tin whistle player Spider Stacy to perform Pogues songs accompanied by Cajun music band Lost Bayou Ramblers under the name Poguetry. In February and March 2020 Poguetry played an eight date tour of the US.

Since 2020 O'Riordan has hosted a weekly radio show, "The Rocky O'Riordan Show" on U2-X Radio, an artist-branded channel which is part of SiriusXM.

References

1965 births
British bass guitarists
British people of Irish descent
British people of Scottish descent
Living people
Musicians from London
The Pogues members
Elvis Costello
Women bass guitarists
British expatriates in Nigeria
The Radiators from Space members
20th-century British musicians
21st-century British musicians